Max M. Dill (September 15, 1876 – November 21, 1949) was an American vaudeville comedian who starred briefly in film between 1916 and 1917.

Dill was part of the vaudeville team Kolb and Dill, partnering with Clarence Kolb. Dill's short career in film began when he was 39 years old. Kolb co-starred in some of his films. Dill worked in Beloved Rogues with actor Harry von Meter in 1917, and it was Dill's last film, though he lived for decades more. (Kolb later returned to films and was a busy Hollywood character actor from the 1930s to the 1950s.)

Filmography

Beloved Rogues (1917; as Max M. Dill) .... Mike Amsterdammer
Glory (1917) .... Mike Plotts
Lonesome Town (1916; as Max M. Dill) .... Mike
Peck o' Pickles (1916; as Max M. Dill) .... Adolph Busch
Bluff (1916; as Max M. Dill) .... Mike
The Three Pals (1916; as Max M. Dill) .... Mike
A Million for Mary (1916) .... Mike
Two Flaming Youths (1927) .... Dill

External links

 
 

1876 births
1949 deaths
American male silent film actors
Male actors from Cleveland
Vaudeville performers
20th-century American male actors